is a 2007 Japanese – Mongolian historical drama film depicting the life of Genghis Khan.

Plot
Temujin (Takashi Sorimachi) is born to the chief of a Mongolian tribe, and grows up as the one who carries the blood of “blue wolf”.  He grows up and marries Börte (Rei Kikukawa). But one night, she is taken away by another tribe. Temujin rescues her, only to find her pregnant. She later gives birth to a boy . As the boy may be a son of a stranger, Temujin names him  Kuchi (Kenichi Matsuyama), meaning outsider, and refuses to accept him as his son. The time goes on and Temujin is enthroned as the King of Mongolia. He changes his name to Genghis Khan and pledges to avenge his long-time enemy, the Jin Dynasty. Genghis Khan finally acknowledges Kuchi as his own son, and they decide to fight together, but Kuchi is killed by the enemy. The lonely battle of Genghis continues without end. A historical drama about the life of Genghis Khan, a hero who united the Mongol Empire and conquered half the known world.

Cast
Takashi Sorimachi as Temüjin
Rei Kikukawa as Börte
Kenichi Matsuyama as Kuchi
Yoshihiko Hakamada as Hasar
Go Ara as Khulan
Yūsuke Hirayama as Jamukha
Naoki Hosaka as Yesügei Bagatur
Hiroki Matsukata as Toghrul Khan
Eugene Nomura as Bo'orču
Eri Shimomiya as Temulen
Shōhei Yamazaki as Behter
Kairi Narita as Belgutei
Takuya Noro as Chilaun
Sōsuke Ikematsu as young Temüjin
Ami Takeishi as young Börte
Takeshi Ōbayashi as Caravan Chief

Production
Takehiro Nakajima and Shōichi Maruyama adapted the screenplay from the historical-fiction novels Chi Hate Umi Tsukiru Made: Shōsetsu Chingisu Hān (Ue) and Chi Hate Umi Tsukiru Made: Shōsetsu Chingisu Hān (Shita) by Seiichi Morimura.

The film cost US$30 million to make, and was filmed over four months in 2006 in Mongolia, featuring more than 27,000 extras, as well as 5,000 Mongolian Army soldiers.

Release
Genghis Khan: To the Ends of Earth and Sea was released in Japan on March 3, 2007, and in Hong Kong on April 26, 2007. The film was screened at the Cannes Film Market, the Moscow International Film Festival and the 2007 Antalya Golden Orange Film Festival. It was the opening film of the 5th World Film Festival of Bangkok and the San Francisco Asian Film Festival.

Genghis Khan was released by The Bigger Picture in only 40 U.S. theaters on February 21, 2008. As of February 25, it has made only US$3,892 there. It grossed nearly US$11 million in Japan and Mongolia.

Genghis Khan was released on DVD in the US in 2008.

See also
 List of Asian historical drama films

References

External links
Funimation official site
Official site

Nakaba Higurashi's Manga

2007 films
Japanese war drama films
Films based on Japanese novels
Films directed by Shinichirō Sawai
Films scored by Taro Iwashiro
Depictions of Genghis Khan on film
2000s Japanese-language films
Mongolian drama films
Funimation
Shochiku films
2007 biographical drama films
Films set in the 12th century
Films set in the 13th century
Films set in the Mongol Empire
Films set in Mongolia
Japan–Mongolia relations
2007 drama films
2000s war drama films
2000s Japanese films